Jerónimo Aníbal Bidegain (born January 16, 1977 in Buenos Aires) is an Argentine volleyball player. He is 200 cm and weighs 93 kg. He played with the national team in 2000 Summer Olympics and 2004 Summer Olympics.

Career
1999-01  Club De Amigos
2001-02  Panini Modena
2002-03  CV Almería (Champion)
2003-04  Swiss Medical Monteros (Champion)
2005-06  ULBRA
2006-07  Fenerbahçe Istanbul
2007   Azul Volley
2008   Olio Pignatelli Isernia
2009   Chubut Volley
2011   Instituto Dr. Carlos Pellegrini

References

External links
Profile @ FIVB.org

1977 births
Living people
Volleyball players from Buenos Aires
Argentine men's volleyball players
Olympic volleyball players of Argentina
Volleyball players at the 2000 Summer Olympics
Volleyball players at the 2004 Summer Olympics
Fenerbahçe volleyballers